Rhoda Vwosi  (born ) is a retired Kenyan female volleyball player.

She was part of the Kenya women's national volleyball team. On club level she played with Kenya Pipeline.

Clubs
 Kenya Pipeline (1994)

References

1965 births
Living people
Kenyan women's volleyball players
Place of birth missing (living people)